Dongbaoxing Road is a station on Shanghai Metro Line 3. Towards South, this is the last station before sharing with Line 4.

References

Line 3, Shanghai Metro
Shanghai Metro stations in Hongkou District
Railway stations in China opened in 2000
Railway stations in Shanghai